Madanga  is an administrative ward in Pangani District of Tanga Region in Tanzania.

In 2016 the Tanzania National Bureau of Statistics report there were 3,606 people in the ward, from 3,298 in 2012.

References

Wards of Pangani District
Wards of Tanga Region
Populated places in Tanga Region